Zoe Fleury, better known by her stage name Zowie, is a singer-songwriter from New Zealand. Zowie has toured with artists Katy Perry, Mark Ronson, The Kills and Peaches under the name Bionic Pixie. She later changed her name to Zowie, and released her debut single "Broken Machine", which entered the Top 10 on the Official New Zealand Music Chart. Her debut album, Love Demolition, peaked at number 31 on the New Zealand Top 40 Album chart. Fleury is also one half of the duo 'The Bengal Lights', playing the drums.

Biography

1988-2009: Early life and career beginnings

Zoe Fleury was born in Auckland New Zealand in 1988, and is the daughter of musician Johnny Fleury. Zowie began playing drums at the age of 11, and wanted to have a career in the music industry. Fleury later went to school to study drumming, and later joined various "punk rock" bands and experimented with screamo music and lyrics. This later led to the formation of the punk rock female duo The Bengal Lights. After finishing school, Fleury continued to work in the band as well as study the music business by working at Universal Music Group and Warner Music Group. Zowie later began writing her own music under the name Bionic Pixie, a character she created. Under the name, she released the electronic song titled "Toss the Coin", which later began being played at various fashion shows. Despite this, the single received no official release. Under the new identity, Zowie was a performer at the 2009 Big Day Out in Auckland. Zowie later said of the experience "I was thinking that no-one was going to be there, but [I was] still excited, obviously. But then we got on stage and the whole field was packed out. Obviously everyone goes to the first stage when you're the first band playing, but in the crowd were heaps of representatives from Universal and Sony." Zowie then went on to sign a record deal with Sony,

2010-present: Commercial success and Love Demolition
Following her decision to sign with Sony Music Entertainment, Zowie began traveling while working on her debut album. Zowie worked on the album in numerous countries, including the United States, Australia, Sweden, England and her home country New Zealand. Several of the album's tracks were recorded in Los Angeles, California. On recording the album, Fleury stated "I was writing with people who had written lots of amazing songs. It was a good brain workout that's for sure. People who'd written for Miike Snow, Britney Spears, Ladyhawke and Gwen Stefani, it was an amazing experience. I also worked with Atticus Ross who does a lot of stuff with Trent Reznor. Those tracks aren't on the album, we're still finishing them off. He was one of the main people I wanted to write with, so that was cool." On 6 September 2010 Zowie released her debut single, "Broken Machine". The single was released exclusively in New Zealand. The single became a success in the country, where it peaked at number 9 on the New Zealand Singles Chart. "Broken Machine" spent a total of 12 weeks on the chart. Following the success of the single, American blogger Perez Hilton named Zowie one of the Top 5 Artist to watch for in 2011. Her second single, "Bite Back", was her first single to be released outside of New Zealand, receiving a digital release in both Australia and the United States. Though it failed to chart in the United States, it did have success in Australia, peaking at number 2 on the Australian Dance Chart and spending over 20 weeks on the chart. Following the success of the single, Zowie toured with Mark Ronson in March 2011. In May 2011, Fleury toured with US pop star Katy Perry on her California Dreams Tour, performing 11 shows in Australia and New Zealand.

Zowie released her first promotional single, "Smash It", on 16 September 2011. The song serves as her second released song outside of New Zealand, and third total. The song was featured on the US show Pretty Little Liars later that year. In 2013 'Smash It' was also used as the theme song to season 2 of New Zealand comedy show Super City. A music video for the song was released in November 2011, featuring Fleury in various costumes and lighting. Zowie's third official single, "My Calculator", was released on 11 May 2012 in the United Kingdom. When describing the song, Zowie stated "The idea behind 'My Calculator' is someone toying around with your head. It's sung in quite a sarcastic tone toward the person it’s about." She worked on the song with collaborator Henrik Jonback, who had previously worked with artist such as Miike Snow, Britney Spears and Kylie Minogue. Zowie's debut studio album Love Demolition. The album was only released in New Zealand, where it debuted and peaked at number 31 on the New Zealand Albums Chart.

Image
Based on her live performances and music videos, Zowie has received comparison to American dance singer Lady Gaga but artists like David Bowie, Trent Reznor and Prince are who have influenced her look. When asked about her style with music videos, Fleury commented "With videos, it’s kind of a mixture. I’m constantly thinking about the whole thing, my outfit, make up and sound, and how it will work well with my performance. Sometimes I design the outfits myself, or I collab with someone. It’s more like a mixture of things that when it comes to my style, I like mixing cute stuff with dark stuff." When speaking on her choice of clothing during performances, Fleury said "I like fashion and I like to make a statement with it, but I don't want it to be boobs hanging out or anything - it just doesn't interest me."

Characters
Fleury has listed the personas she performs under as "characters" and "alter egos", and each has a back story. She has stated that her first character, Bionic Pixie, was sent from the year 3000. Eventually, Fleury stated that she had morphed into a new character who was still 'A' Bionic Pixie but been given a name, Zowie. When asked about her "Zowie" character, Fleury stated "Zowie is another character. She is still Zoe Fleury but a little removed. I was once called Bionic Pixie, as well.  So I was thinking that Zowie is an extension of Bionic Pixie." Fleury has also stated that the characters "transform" overtime, and that Zowie is quickly transforming.

Musical style
Zowie's music has been classified as predominantly electropop and new wave. Fleury herself has described her debut album, Love Demolition, as having an "industrial, hip hop side, but still a light pop side". When asked about her recording style and choosing songs, Fleury stated "Drumming & rhythm were really important elements to me to help shape this record. The beat has to be interesting to me. It's generally how I use to start my songs when writing, by humming a beat and recording it down. I listen to everything in a super rhythmic way - vocal lines, guitars, keys lines." While speaking on musical tones she enjoys, Fleury commented "I like dark and pretty but not just one or the other. It's a mixture of heavy and pretty on the album for sure." Fleury has stated that both of her alter egos have different musical styles. music. On her musical style, Fleury has stated "I definitely embrace the pop side [of music]. For example, my favourite band is Nine Inch Nails, who are super industrial, super dark, but they mixed in, sometimes I think without people noticing, these really beautiful pop elements. And that's what I wanted to achieve with this album - having it dark and pretty." The sound of her debut has been described as "a musical playground of industrial pop, electronic hip-hop, and punk, where eclectic beats dance to distorted guitars and slick chants." Fleury herself has said of the album "I didn’t want it to be a typical music project…I’m always looking to do something different from my peers." Fleury's voice has been compared to that of Katie White, lead singer of the UK band The Ting Tings. Fleury's vocal performance has also been compared to that of United States pop singer Kesha. Zowie has listed Gary Numan, Michael Jackson, and Nine Inch Nails as some of her musical influences.

Discography

Studio albums

Singles

Official singles

References

External links
Official website

Living people
New Zealand women pop singers
New Zealand singer-songwriters
People from Auckland
Synth-pop singers
Year of birth missing (living people)